Revolver is a heavy metal music and hard rock magazine, published in North America. It has been in print since 2000, and is about both established acts and up-and-comers in heavy music. In the fall of 2017, Revolver underwent a brand relaunch, including a redesigned print edition and website, intended to embody the art and culture of heavy music.

The magazine was formerly owned by Harris Publications, Future US, and NewBay Media. In 2017 Revolver was bought by Project M Group LLC.

Epiphone Revolver Music Awards
The Epiphone Revolver Golden Gods Music Awards is an annual awards ceremony established in 2009 by Revolver magazine. Originally called the Revolver Golden God Awards they went on hiatus in 2015 and came back in 2016.

References

External links
 

Bimonthly magazines published in the United States
Music magazines published in the United States
Heavy metal publications
Magazines established in 2000
2017 mergers and acquisitions

Project M Group brands